"There Ain't No Good Chain Gang" is a song written by Hal Bynum and Dave Kirby, and recorded by American country music artists Johnny Cash and Waylon Jennings.  It was released in May 1978 as the second single from the album I Would Like to See You Again.  The song reached #2 on the Billboard Hot Country Singles & Tracks chart.

Content
The song is written and sung from the perspective of a prison inmate, writing back home to his family.  He tells of the lessons he's learned while incarcerated; the chorus tells the four main ones:
"There ain't no good in an evil-hearted woman",
"I ain't cut out to be no Jesse James",
"You don't go writing hot checks down in Mississippi", and
"There ain't no good chain gang".

Chart performance

References

1978 singles
1978 songs
Johnny Cash songs
Waylon Jennings songs
Songs written by Hal Bynum
Song recordings produced by Larry Butler (producer)
Columbia Records singles
Songs about prison